Renaissance Enterprises is a nonprofit organization devoted to bringing the arts to residents of long term care facilities and senior centers.  They address the urgent need to increase quality of life of the isolated elderly by providing regular creative arts (e.g. music or painting) interaction between the elderly and professional artists, artisans and performers.

Origins

Renaissance Enterprises was founded in 1988 by Bob Rowe to reach out to elderly members of the community. The organization operates in Michigan, Indiana, Illinois, Tennessee and New York as well as some neighboring states.

Mission
The goal of Renaissance Enterprises is to provide the highest quality arts and music programs to nursing homes and related care facilities utilizing the services of the highest quality artists, artisans and performers whose vision matches our own, to love and serve the elderly through the arts.

What we do: 

Renaissance Enterprises brings the live arts to residents.  They strive to bring comfort, reassurance, respect, and love (and some fun too) for residents of long term care facilities and senior centers. 

The type of creative arts they provide include music, dance, puppetry, live art*, and others. 

Why: 

It is well known that music, and other live arts*, can assist healing and ease suffering.

This is confirmed in respected professional publications. It is noted that arts can provide a soothing effect on agitated patients, serve as diversion from sadness or anger, can positively effect moods, and touch multi levels of consciousness. 

Renaissance produced a booklet for artists to guide them in performances for these special audiences.  Therein they also note that often they experience small wonders where an audience member had been silent for months or years but the music awakened something in them and prompted them to speech. 

Renaissance uses a staff of 25 volunteer artists for this purpose and typically delivers over 100 performances per year to audiences that are confined.

Therapeutic Entertainment 
Renaissance Enterprises provides artists.  Artists who then provide entertainment.  Entertainment intended to bring comfort, fun, reassurance, love and respect to those living in care facilities or attending senior centers.  Audience members may find the entertainment / activities therapeutic in some way.

However, Renaissance Enterprises does NOT provide Art Therapy, Music Therapy, or Dance and Movement Therapy.  Art Therapists, Music Therapists, Dance Therapists, and Creative Arts Therapists are allied and/or mental health care professionals who go through a lengthy educational and training process, complete supervised fieldwork, and pass board exams.  In the US, they are licensed or registered in some states.  They also refer to the people they work with as clients or patients, not audience members.  Renaissance Enterprises' artists do not seek to provide therapy, as they are not trained to do so.  They do recognize, though, that music is very powerful and many of them have witnessed amazing moments during their work.
 *Live art (1) Creative art, such as a music performance, that is experienced live, in person, in real-time, rather than watching and/or listening to the performance on an electronic device. (2) "Live Art is when an artist chooses to make work directly in front of the audience in space and time. So instead of making an object, or an environment (a painting for example) and leaving it for the audience to encounter in their own time, Live Art comes into being at the actual moment of encounter between artist and spectator. Or at least even if they are not physically present, the artist sets up a situation in which the audience experience [sic] the work in a particular space and time, and the notion of ‘presence’ is key to the concerns of the work."

Notability

In 2006 the executive director was presented with the Mother Teresa Award for this work.

In 1994, Mother Teresa wrote: "Your work of love in nursing homes, hospitals and for the aged, the neglected and the forgotten is truly the work of peace, for the fruit of love is service and the fruit of service is peace. Works of love like yours bring one face to face with God. Continue to use music to make the presence of God - His love and compassion better known to those in need - His little ones who have forgotten to smile. My prayer is with you in a special way and with all connected with Renaissance Enterprises."

The organization's work has been featured in several newspapers and magazine, including Time Magazine, USA Today, Catholic Digest Cover, Mature Years, Daily Word, National Enquirer and Detroit News.

Renaissance is also included in CNN's iReport web presence, with a video and writeup about the organization.

See the article on Bob Rowe for description of awards and recognition.

Funding

Renaissance is supported by charitable foundations, individual donations, corporate donations and support from the care facilities where they work and from sales of artist's CDs.

Foundations that have supported Renaissance Enterprises include:
 Arcus Foundation
 Arts Council of Greater Kalamazoo
 Battle Creek Community Foundation
 Berrien Community Foundation
 Dorothy U. Dalton Foundation 
 Frey Foundation
 Frederick S. Upton Foundation
 Guido Binda Foundation 
 Harold & Grace Upjohn Foundation 
 Irving S. Gilmore Foundation
 Kalamazoo Community Foundation
 Leo Buscaglia Foundation
 Frederick S. Upton Foundation 
 Michigan Council for Arts and Cultural Affairs (MCACA)

References

External links
 Renaissance Enterprises
 Mother Teresa Award
 Catholic On Line
 Arts Council of Kalamazoo
 Battle Creek Community Foundation
 Berrien Community Foundation
 Irving S. Gilmore Foundation
 Kalamazoo Community Foundation
 Leo Buscaglia Foundation
 Candace Corrigan

Sources
 http://newmusic.clearchannel.com/artist/bobrowe

Charities for the elderly
Health charities in the United States
Medical and health organizations based in Michigan
Nursing homes in the United States
Senior centers
1988 establishments in Michigan
Charities based in Michigan